The Men's ski slopestyle competition at the FIS Freestyle Ski and Snowboarding World Championships 2019 was held on February 6, 2019. Due to bad weather conditions, the competition was moved back one day.

Qualification
The qualification was started at 11:45. The best five skiers of each heat qualified for the final.

Heat 1

Heat 2

Final
The final was started at 14:45.

References

Men's ski slopestyle